The women's doubles tournament at the 1972 French Open was held from 22 May to 4 June 1972 on the outdoor clay courts at the Stade Roland Garros in Paris, France. The fourth-seeded team of Billie Jean King and Betty Stöve won the title, defeating the unseeded pair of Winnie Shaw and Nell Truman in the final in straight sets.

Seeds

Draw

Finals

Top half

Bottom half

References

External links
 Main draw
1972 French Open – Women's draws and results at the International Tennis Federation

Women's Doubles
French Open by year – Women's doubles
1972 in women's tennis
1972 in French women's sport